Ophthalmopone is a ponerine genus of ants found in Sub-Saharan Africa. Workers are slender and large in size (8–13.5 mm). Queens seem to be absent, but gamergates (reproductive female workers) present.

Species
Ophthalmopone berthoudi Forel, 1890
Ophthalmopone depilis Emery, 1902
Ophthalmopone hottentota (Emery, 1886)
Ophthalmopone ilgii Forel, 1894
Ophthalmopone mocquerysi Emery, 1902

References

Ponerinae
Ant genera
Hymenoptera of Africa